Acacia leptopetala is a shrub belonging to the genus Acacia and the subgenus Phyllodineae that is endemic to an area of south western Australia.

Description
The glabrous branchlets are often covered in a fine white powdery coating. Like most species of Acacia it has phyllodes rather than true leaves. The thinly coriaceous, glaucous and evergreen phyllodes have a narrowly elliptic to narrowly oblanceolate shape that can be recurved. It produces yellow flowers from November to January.

Taxonomy
The species was first formally described by the botanist George Bentham in 1855 as part of the work Plantae Muellerianae: Mimoseae as published in the journal Linnaea: ein Journal für die Botanik in ihrem ganzen Umfange, oder Beiträge zur Pflanzenkunde. It was reclassified as Racosperma leptopetalum in 2003 by Leslie Pedley then transferred back to genus Acacia in 2006.

Distribution
It is native to an area in the Great Southern, Wheatbelt and Goldfields-Esperance regions of Western Australia where it is commonly found on flats growing in a variety of soils. The species is located from around Bencubbin in the north to around Nyabing in the south west and as far as Ravensthorpe in the east where it is found growing in loamy, clay,  sandy loam, sand and sandy gravel soils as a part of mallee scrub.

See also
 List of Acacia species

References

leptopetala
Acacias of Western Australia
Taxa named by George Bentham
Plants described in 1855